Rakesh Singh may refer to:

 Chaudhary Rakesh Singh Chaturvedi (born 1962), Indian politician
 Rakesh Singh (politician) (born 1962), Indian politician
 Rakesh Singh (soldier) (1970–1992), Indian Army officer
 Rakesh Pratap Singh (born 1976), Indian politician